A fallen angel, in Abrahamic religions, is an angel who has been exiled or banished from Heaven.

Fallen Angel or The Fallen Angel may also refer to:

Film
 Fallen Angel (1945 film), a film-noir by Otto Preminger
 Fallen Angel (1981 film), a TV film starring Dana Hill
 Fallen Angel (1991 film), a TV film starring Michael Chow
 Fallen Angel (1997 film), a film featuring George Buck Flower
 Fallen Angel (2003 film), a TV film starring Gary Sinise and Joely Richardson
 Gram Parsons: Fallen Angel, a 2004 documentary film about Gram Parsons
 The Fallen Angel (2010 film), a Japanese film by Genjiro Arato
 Fallen Angel (2010 film), a film starring Erik Contreras

Novels
 The Fallen Angel (novel), a 2012 novel by Daniel Silva
 Angel of Ruin, a 2001 novel by Kim Wilkins, released in the UK as Fallen Angel
 Fallen Angel, a novel by Howard Fast
 Fallen Angel, a novel by Kosuke Kindaichi

Music

Albums
 Fallen Angel (Uriah Heep album), or the title song, 1978
 Fallen Angel (25 ta Life EP), 2006
 Fallen Angel (Versailles Suicide EP), or the title song, 2002
 Fallen Angel, by Maxim Reality, 2005
 Fallen Angel, by Punky Meadows, 2016
 Fallen Angel..., or the 1960 title song, by Webb Pierce, 1961

Songs
 "Fallen Angel" (King Crimson song), 1974
 "Fallen Angel" (Poison song), (1988)
 "Fallen Angel" (Rogue song), 1975; covered by Frankie Valli (1976)
 "Fallen Angel" (Three Days Grace song), 2015
 "Fallen Angel" (Tix song), 2021
 "Fallen Angel" (Traci Lords song), 1995
 "Fallen Angel", by Aldo Nova from Twitch, 1985
 "Fallen Angel", by Alphaville from Forever Young, 1984
 "Fallen Angel", by Alvin Lee and Mylon Lefevre from On the Road to Freedom, 1973
 "Fallen Angel", by Anri from Trouble in Paradise, 1986
 "Fallen Angel", by Baby, 1977
 "Fallen Angel", by Barbara Dickson, 1978
 "Fallen Angel", by Blue Öyster Cult from Cultösaurus Erectus, 1980
 "Fallen Angel", by Bulldozer from The Day of Wrath, 1984
 "Fallen Angel", by Chris Brown from Exclusive, 2007
 "Fallen Angel", by Coney Hatch from Outa Hand, 1983
 "Fallen Angel", by Debbie Gibson from Out of the Blue, 1987
 "Fallen Angel", by Diamond Head from All Will Be Revealed, 2005
 "Fallen Angel", by Elbow from Cast of Thousands, 2003
 "Fallen Angel", by Esham from Judgement Day, 1992
 "Fallen Angel", by Jag Panzer from the re-release of Ample Destruction, 1984
 "Fallen Angel", by John Entwistle from Too Late the Hero, 1981
 "Fallen Angel", by Ketty Lester, 1963
 "Fallen Angel", by Kit Hain from School for Spies, 1983
 "Fallen Angel", by Neil Young from Mirror Ball, 1995
 "Fallen Angel", by Possessed from Seven Churches, 1985
 "Fallen Angel", by Robbie Robertson from Robbie Robertson, 1987
 "Fallen Angel", by Sirenia from The Enigma of Life, 2011
 "Fallen Angel", by Styx from Brave New World, 1999
 "Fallen Angel", by Treat, 1986
 "The Fallen Angel", by Iron Maiden from Brave New World, 2000
 "(She's Just A) Fallen Angel", by Starz from Starz, 1976

Television
 Fallen Angel (British TV series), a 2007 series based on the Roth trilogy by Andrew Taylor
 Fallen Angel (Singaporean-Malaysian TV series), a 2007 series starring Shaun Chen
 "Fallen Angel" (The X-Files), a 1993 episode of The X-Files
 "Fallen Angel", an episode of Xena: Warrior Princess
 "Fallen Angel", an episode of Charlie's Angels
 "Fallen Angel", an episode of Kamen Rider Hibiki
 "Fallen Angel", an episode of Teenage Mutant Ninja Turtles

Other uses
 Sacred 2: Fallen Angel, a 2008 fantasy role-playing video game
 Fallen Angel (comics), an American fictional comic book heroine
 Fallen Angel (cocktail), a gin cocktail
 The Fallen Angel (painting), an 1847 painting by Alexandre Cabanel
 Christopher Daniels or The Fallen Angel (born 1970), professional wrestler
 Fallen Angel, a moniker used by the person who sent the 2003 ricin letters in the United States
 Fallen angel, a term for a company whose credit rating has been downgraded from investment-grade to high-yield/junk status

See also
 
 Ángel caído (disambiguation)
 Angel of Darkness (disambiguation)
 Angels Fall (disambiguation)
 Dark Angel (disambiguation)
 Evil Angel (disambiguation)
 Falling Angel, a 1978 novel by William Hjortsberg
 Fallen Angels (disambiguation)
 :Category:Fallen angels